= Bañado Norte =

Slum village in Asunción, Paraguay

Bañado Norte is a slum village in Asunción, Paraguay, near the Paraguay River. It was visited by Pope Francis on July 12, 2015. There is a Roman Catholic chapel called Chapel of San Juan Bautista.
